The harp is a stringed musical instrument that has individual strings running at an angle to its soundboard; the strings are plucked with the fingers. Harps can be made and played in various ways, standing or sitting, and in orchestras or concerts.  Its most common form is triangular in shape and made of wood.  Some have multiple rows of strings and pedal attachments.

Ancient depictions of harps were recorded in Mesopotamia, Persia (now Iraq and Iran) and Egypt, and later in India and China.  By medieval times harps had spread across Europe.  Harps were found across the Americas where it was a popular folk tradition in some areas. Distinct designs also emerged from the African continent. Harps have symbolic political traditions and are often used in logos, including in Ireland.

History

Harps have been known since antiquity in Asia, Africa, and Europe, dating back at least as early as 3000 BCE. The instrument had great popularity in Europe during the Middle Ages and Renaissance, where it evolved into a wide range of variants with new technologies, and was disseminated to Europe's colonies, finding particular popularity in Latin America.

Although some ancient members of the harp family died out in the Near East and South Asia, descendants of early harps are still played in Myanmar and parts of Africa; other variants defunct in Europe and Asia have been used by folk musicians in the modern era.

Origin

Middle East

The earliest harps and lyres were found in Sumer, 3500 BCE, and several harps were excavated from burial pits and royal tombs in Ur. The oldest depictions of harps without a forepillar can be seen adjacent to the Near East, in the wall paintings of ancient Egyptian tombs in the Nile Valley, which date from as early as 3000 BCE. These murals show an arched harp, an instrument that closely resembles the hunter's bow, without the pillar that we find in modern harps.

The Chang flourished in Persia in many forms from its introduction, about 4000 BCE, until the 17th century.

Around 1900 BCE arched harps in the Iraq-Iran region were replaced by angular harps with vertical or horizontal sound boxes.

By the start of the Common Era, "robust, vertical, angular harps", which had become predominant in the Hellenistic world, were cherished in the Sasanian court. In the last century of the Sasanian period, angular harps were redesigned to make them as light as possible ("light, vertical, angular harps"); while they became more elegant, they lost their structural rigidity. At the height of the Persian tradition of illustrated book production (1300–1600 CE), such light harps were still frequently depicted, although their use as musical instruments was reaching its end.

South Asia

Mesolithic era paintings from Bhimbetka show harp playing. An arched harp made of wooden brackets and metal strings is depicted on an Indus seal. The works of the Tamil Sangam literature describe the harp and its variants, as early as 200 BCE. Variants were described ranging from 14 to 17 strings, and the instrument used by wandering minstrels for accompaniment. Iconographic evidence of the yaal appears in temple statues dated as early as 600 BCE One of the Sangam works, the Kallaadam recounts how the first yaaḻ harp was inspired by an archer's bow, when he heard the musical sound of its twang.

Another early South Asian harp was the ancient veena, not to be confused with the modern Indian veena which is a type of lute. Some Samudragupta gold coins show of the mid-4th century CE show (presumably) the king Samudragupta himself playing the instrument. The ancient veena survives today in Burma, in the form of the saung harp still played there.

East Asia

The harp was popular in ancient China and neighboring regions, though harps are largely extinct in East Asia in the modern day. The Chinese konghou harp is documented as early as the Spring and Autumn period (770–476 BCE), and became extinct during the Ming dynasty (1368–1644 CE). A similar harp, the Gonghu was played in ancient Korea, documented as early as the Goguryeo period (37 BCE – 686 CE).

Development

Europe

While the angle and bow harps held popularity elsewhere, European harps favored the "pillar", a third structural member to support the far ends of the arch and soundbox.  A harp with a triangular three-part frame is depicted on 8th-century Pictish stones in Scotland and in manuscripts (e.g. the Utrecht Psalter) from early 9th-century France. The curve of the harp's neck is a result of the proportional shortening of the basic triangular form to keep the strings equidistant; if the strings were proportionately distant they would be farther apart.

As European harps evolved to play more complex music, a key consideration was some way to facilitate the quick changing of a string's pitch to be able to play more chromatic notes. By the Baroque period in Italy and Spain, more strings were added to allow for chromatic notes in more complex harps. In Germany in the second half of the 17th century, diatonic single-row harps were fitted with manually turned hooks that fretted individual strings to raise their pitch by a half step. In the 18th century, a link mechanism was developed connecting these hooks with pedals, leading to the invention of the single-action pedal harp.

The first primitive form of pedal harps was developed in the Tyrol region of Austria. Jacob Hochbrucker was the next to design an improved pedal mechanism around 1720, followed in succession by Krumpholtz, Naderman, and the Erard company, who came up with the double mechanism, in which a second row of hooks was installed along the neck, capable of raising the pitch of a string by either one or two half steps. While one course of European harps led to greater complexity, resulting largely in the modern pedal harp, other harping traditions maintained simpler diatonic instruments which survived and evolved into modern traditions.

Americas
In the Americas, harps are widely but sparsely distributed, except in certain regions where the harp traditions are very strong. Such important centeres include Mexico, the Andean region, Venezuela, and Paraguay. They are derived from the Baroque harps that were brought from Spain during the colonial period. Detailed features vary from place to place.

The Paraguayan harp is that country's national instrument, and has gained a worldwide reputation, with international influences alongside folk traditions. They have around 36 strings, are played with fingernails, and with a narrowing spacing and lower tension than modern Western harps, and have a wide and deep soundbox that tapers to the top.

The harp is also found in Argentina, though in Uruguay it was largely displaced in religious music by the organ by the end of the 18th century. The harp is historically found in Brazil, but mostly in the south of the country.

The Andean harp (Spanish/), also known as the Peruvian harp, or indigenous harp, is widespread among peoples living in the highlands of the Andes: Quechua and Aymara, mainly in Peru, and also in Bolivia and Ecuador. It is relatively large, with a significantly increased volume of the resonator box, which gives basses a special richness. It usually accompanies love dances and songs, such as huayno. One of the most famous performers on the Andean harp was Juan Cayambe (Pimampiro Canton, Imbabura Province, Ecuador)

Mexican  harp music of Veracruz has also gained some international recognition, evident in the popularity of "La Bamba". The  is typically played while standing. In southern Mexico (Chiapas), there is a very different indigenous style of harp music.

 The harp arrived in Venezuela with Spanish colonists. By the 2020s, three types of harps are typically found: 
 the traditional llanera harp, made of Cedar wood and has 32 strings, originally of the gut, but in modern times are of nylon. It is used to accompany both dancers and singers playing joropo music, a traditional form of Venezuelan music, also known as llanera music. 
 the Venezuelan electric harp

Africa

A number of types of harps are found in Africa, predominantly not of the three-sided frame-harp type found in Europe. A number of these, referred to generically as African harps, are bow or angle harps, which lack forepillars joining the neck to the body.

A number of harp-like instruments in Africa are not easily classified with European categories. Instruments like the West African kora and Mauritanian ardin are sometimes labeled as "spike harp", "bridge harp", or harp lute since their construction includes a bridge which holds the strings laterally, vice vertically entering the soundboard.

Middle East
While lyres and zithers have persisted in the Middle East, most of the true harps of the region have become extinct, though some are undergoing initial revivals. The Turkish çeng was a nine-string harp in the Ottoman Empire which became extinct at the end of the 17th century, but has undergone some revival and evolution since the late 20th century. A similar harp, the changi survives in the Svaneti region of Georgia.

South Asia
In India, the Bin-Baia harp survives about the Padhar people of Madhya Pradesh. The Kafir harp has been part of Nuristani musical tradition for many years.

East Asia

The harp largely became extinct in East Asia by the 17th century; around the year 1000, harps like the vajra began to replace prior harps. A few examples survived to the modern era, particularly Myanmar's saung-gauk, which is considered the national instrument in that country. Though the ancient Chinese konghou has not been directly resurrected, the name has been revived and applied to a modern newly invented instrument based on the Western classical harp, but with the strings doubled back to form two notes per string, allowing advanced techniques such as note-bending.

Modern European and American harps

Concert harp

The concert harp is a technologically advanced instrument, particularly distinguished by its use of "pedals", foot-controlled devices which can alter the pitch of given strings, making it fully chromatic and thus able to play a wide body of classical repertoire. The pedal harp contains seven pedals that each affect the tuning of all strings of one pitch-class. The pedals, from left to right, are D, C, B on the left side and E, F, G, A on the right. Pedals were first introduced in 1697 by Jakob Hochbrucker of Bavaria. In 1811 these were upgraded to the "double action" pedal system patented by Sébastien Erard.

The addition of pedals broadened the harp's abilities, allowing its gradual entry into the classical orchestra, largely beginning in the 19th century. The harp played little or no role in early classical music (being used only a handful of times by major composers such as Mozart and Beethoven), and its usage by Cesar Franck in his Symphony in D minor (1888) was described as "revolutionary" despite some body of prior classical usage. In the 20th century, the pedal harp found use outside of classical music, entering musical comedy films in 1929 with Arthur "Harpo" Marx, jazz with Casper Reardon in 1934, the Beatles 1967 single "She's Leaving Home", and several works by Björk which featured harpist Zeena Parkins. In the early 1980s, Swiss harpist Andreas Vollenweider exposed the concert harp to large new audiences with his popular new age/jazz albums and concert performances.

Folk, lever, and Celtic instruments

In the modern era, there is a family of mid-size harps, generally with nylon strings, and optionally with partial or full levers but without pedals. They range from two to six octaves, and are plucked with the fingers using a similar technique to the pedal harp. Though these harps evoke ties to historical European harps, their specifics are modern, and they are frequently referred to broadly as "Celtic harps" due to their region of revival and popular association, or more generically as "folk harps" due to their use in non-classical music, or as "lever harps" to contrast their modifying mechanism with the larger pedal harp.

The modern Celtic harp began to appear in the early 19th century in Ireland, contemporary with the dying-out of earlier forms of Gaelic harp. Dublin pedal harp maker John Egan developed a new type of harp which had gut strings and semitone mechanisms like an orchestral pedal harp; it was small and curved like the historical cláirseach or Irish harp, but its strings were of gut and the soundbox was much lighter. In the 1890s a similar new harp was also developed in Scotland as part of a Gaelic cultural revival. In the mid-20th century Jord Cochevelou developed a variant of the modern Celtic harp which he referred to as the "Breton Celtic harp"; his son Alan Stivell was to become the most influential Breton harper, and a strong influence in the broader world of the Celtic harp.

Multi-course harps
A multi-course harp is a harp with more than one row of strings, as opposed to the more common "single course" harp. On a double-harp, the two rows generally run parallel to each other, one on either side of the neck, and are usually both diatonic (sometimes with levers) with identical notes.

The triple harp originated in Italy in the 16th century, and arrived in Wales in the late 17th century where it established itself in the local tradition as the Welsh harp (telyn deires, "three-row harp"). The triple consists of two outer rows of identical diatonic strings with a third set of chromatic strings between them. These strings are off set to permit the harpist to reach past the outer row and pluck an inner string if a chromatic note is needed.

Chromatic-strung harps
Some harps, rather than using pedal or lever devices, achieve chromaticity by simply adding additional strings to cover the notes outside their diatonic home scale. The Welsh triple harp is one such instrument, and two other instruments employing this technique are the cross-strung harp and the inline chromatic harp.

The cross-strung harp has one row of diatonic strings, and a separate row of chromatic notes, angled in an "X" shape so that the row which can be played by the right hand at the top may be played by the left hand at the bottom, and vice versa. This variant was first attested as the arpa de dos órdenes ("two-row harp") in Spain and Portugal, in the 17th century.

The inline chromatic harp is generally a single-course harp with all 12 notes of the chromatic scale appearing in a single row. Single course inline chromatic harps have been produced at least since 1902, when Karl Weigel of Hanover patented a model of inline chromatic harp.

Electric harps
Amplified (electro-acoustic) hollow body and solid body electric lever harps are produced by many harp makers, including Lyon & Healy, Salvi, and Camac. They generally use individual piezo-electric sensors for each string, often in combination with small internal microphones to produce a mixed electrical signal. Hollow body instruments can also be played acoustically, while solid body instruments must be amplified.

The late-20th century Gravikord is a modern purpose-built electric double harp made of stainless steel based on the traditional West African kora.

Variations
Harps vary globally in many ways. In terms of size, many smaller harps can be played on the lap, whereas larger harps are quite heavy and rest on the floor. Different harps may use strings of catgut, nylon, metal, or some combination.

All harps have a neck, resonator, and strings, frame harps or triangular harps have a pillar at their long end to support the strings, while open harps, such as arch harps and bow harps, do not.

Modern harps also vary in techniques used to extend the range and chromaticism of the strings (e.g., adding sharps and flats). On lever harps one adjusts a string's note mid-performance by flipping a lever, which shortens the string enough to raise the pitch by a chromatic sharp. On pedal harps depressing the pedal one step turns geared levers on the strings for all octaves of a single pitch; most allow a second step that turns a second set of levers. The pedal harp is a standard instrument in the orchestra of the Romantic music era (ca. 1800–1910 CE) and the 20th and 21st century music era.

Structure and mechanism

Harps are essentially triangular and made primarily of wood. Strings are made of gut or wire, often replaced in the modern day by nylon or metal. The top end of each string is secured on the crossbar or neck, where each will have a tuning peg or similar device to adjust the pitch. From the crossbar, the string runs down to the sounding board on the resonating body, where it is secured with a knot; on modern harps the string's hole is protected with an eyelet to limit wear on the wood. The distance between the tuning peg and the soundboard, as well as tension and weight of the string, determine the pitch of the string. The body is hollow, and when a taut string is plucked, the body resonates, projecting sound.

The longest side of the harp is called the column or pillar (though some earlier harps, such as a "bow harp", lack a pillar). On most harps the sole purpose of the pillar is to hold up the neck against the great strain of the strings. On harps which have pedals (largely the modern concert harp), the pillar is a hollow column and encloses the rods which adjust the pitches, which are levered by pressing pedals at the base of the instrument.

On harps of earlier design, a single string produces only a single pitch unless it is retuned. In many cases this means such a harp can only play in one key at a time and must be retuned to play in another key. Harpers and luthiers have developed various remedies to this limitation:
 the addition of extra strings to cover chromatic notes (sometimes in separate or angled rows distinct from the main row of strings),
 addition of small levers on the crossbar which when actuated raise the pitch of a string by a set interval (usually a semitone), or
 use of pedals at the base of the instrument, pressed with the foot, which move additional small pegs on the crossbar. The small pegs gently contact the string near the tuning peg, changing the vibrating length, but not the tension, and hence the pitch of the string.
These solutions increase the versatility of a harp at the cost of adding complexity, weight, and expense.

Terminology and etymology
The modern English word harp comes from the Old English hearpe; akin to Old High German harpha. A person who plays a pedal harp is called a "harpist"; a person who plays a folk-harp is called a "harper" or sometimes a "harpist"; either may be called a "harp-player", and the distinctions are not strict.

A number of instruments that are not harps are none-the-less colloquially referred to as "harps". Chordophones like the aeolian harp (wind harp), the autoharp, the psaltery, as well as the piano and harpsichord, are not harps, but zithers, because their strings are parallel to their soundboard. Harps' strings rise approximately perpendicularly from the soundboard. Similarly, the many varieties of harp guitar and harp lute, while chordophones, belong to the lute family and are not true harps. All forms of the lyre and kithara are also not harps, but belong to the fourth family of ancient instruments under the chordophones, the lyres, closely related to the zither family.

The term "harp" has also been applied to many instruments which are not even chordophones. The vibraphone was (and is still) sometimes referred to as the "vibraharp", though it has no strings and its sound is produced by striking metal bars. In blues music, the harmonica is often casually referred to as a "blues harp" or "harp", but it is a free reed wind instrument, not a stringed instrument, and is therefore not a true harp. The Jew's harp is neither Jewish nor a harp; it is a plucked idiophone and likewise not a stringed instrument. The laser harp is not a stringed instrument at all, but is a harp-shaped electronic instrument controller that has laser beams where harps have strings.

As a symbol

Political

Ireland

The harp has been used as a political symbol of Ireland for centuries. Its origin is unknown but from the evidence of the ancient oral and written literature, it has been present in one form or another since at least the 6th century or before. According to tradition, Brian Boru, High King of Ireland (died at the Battle of Clontarf, 1014) played the harp, as did many of the gentry in the country during the period of the Gaelic Lordship of Ireland (ended  1607 with the Flight of the Earls following the Elizabethan Wars).

In traditional Gaelic society every clan and chief of any consequence would have a resident harp player who would compose eulogies and elegies (later known as "planxties") in honour of the leader and chief men of the clan. The harp was adopted as a symbol of the Kingdom of Ireland on the coinage from 1542, and in the Royal Standard of King James VI and I in 1603 and continued to feature on all English and United Kingdom Royal Standards ever since, though the styles of the harps depicted differed in some respects. It was also used on the Commonwealth Jack of Oliver Cromwell, issued in 1649 and on the Protectorate Jack issued in 1658 as well as on the Lord Protector's Standard issued on the succession of Richard Cromwell in 1658. The harp is also traditionally used on the flag of Leinster.

Since 1922, the government of Ireland has used a similar left-facing harp, based on the Trinity College Harp in the Library of Trinity College Dublin as its state symbol. This design first appeared on the Great Seal of the Irish Free State, which in turn was replaced by the coat of arms, the Irish Presidential Standard and the Presidential Seal in the 1937 Constitution of Ireland. The harp emblem is used on official state seals and documents including the Irish passport and has appeared on Irish coinage from the Middle Ages to the current Irish imprints of euro coins.

Elsewhere

The South Asian Tamil harp yaal is the symbol of City of Jaffna, Sri Lanka, whose legendary root originates from a harp player.

The arms of the Finnish city of Kangasala features a red, eagle-headed harp.

Religious

In the context of Christianity, heaven is sometimes symbolically depicted as populated by angels playing harps, giving the instrument associations of the sacred and heavenly. In the Bible, Genesis 4:21 says that Jubal, the first musician and son of Lamech, was 'the father of all who play' the harp and flute.

Many depictions of King David in Jewish art have him holding or playing a harp, such as a sculpture outside King David's tomb in Jerusalem.

Corporate

The harp is also used extensively as a corporate logo, predominantly by companies that have, or wish to suggest, a connection with Ireland. The Irish brewer Guinness has used a right-facing harp (in contrast to the Irish State emblem’s left-facing version) as its emblem since 1759, the Harp Lager brand has done so since 1960. The Irish Independent newspaper has used a harp in its masthead since 1961. The Irish airline Ryanair, founded in 1985, also features a stylised harp in its logo.

Other organisations in Ireland use the harp in their corporate identity, but not always prominently; these include the National University of Ireland and the associated University College Dublin, and the Gaelic Athletic Association. In Northern Ireland, the Police Service of Northern Ireland and the Queen's University of Belfast use the harp as part of their identity.

Sporting
In sport, the harp is used in the emblems of the League of Ireland football team Finn Harps F.C., Donegal's senior soccer club. Outside of Ireland, it appears in the badge of the Scottish Premiership team Hibernian F.C. - a team originally founded by Irish emigrants.

Not all sporting uses of the harp are references to Ireland, however: the Iraqi football club Al-Shorta has used a harp as its emblem since the early 1990s, after they gained the nickname Al-Qithara when their style of play was likened to fine harp-playing by a television presenter.

See also
 List of compositions for harp 
 List of harpists 
 :Category:Harpists

Types of harp
 Celtic harp, or Clàrsach, a modern replica of Medieval north European harps
 Claviharp, a 19th century instrument that combined a harp with a keyboard
 Epigonion, a 40 stringed instrument in ancient Greece thought to have been a harp
 Kantele, a traditional Finnish and Karelian zyther-like instrument
 Konghou, name shared by an ancient Chinese harp and a modern re-adaption
 Kora, a west-African folk-instrument, intermediate between a harp and a lute
 Lyre, kithara, zyther-like instruments used in Greek classical antiquity and later
 Pedal harp, the modern, chromatic concert harp
 Psaltery, a small, flat, lap instrument in the zither family
 Triple harp, a chromatic multi-course harp traditional in Wales

References

Sources

External links

 
 

 
String instruments
Baroque instruments
Orchestral instruments
National symbols of Ireland
Ancient Greek musical instruments
Persian musical instruments